Anopheles (Cellia) karwari is a species complex of zoophilic mosquito belonging to the genus Anopheles. It is found in India, and Sri Lanka, Bangladesh, Sumatra, and Java. A. karwari is a member of the Maculatus Group and the second scarcest species reported from Indonesia. Female is blood sucking and involved in transmitting Plasmodium falciparum, thus an important malarial vector. It is considered a secondary vector in the Australian region, but its vectorial status in South-East Asia was unknown.

Ecology
The species is found from both natural and man-made shady areas including marshes, small, slow-moving streams, seepages, ground and rock pools, springs, and rice fields.

References

External links

karwari
Insects described in 1903